Ariel, Zoey and Elijah Engelbert comprise the group Ariel, Zoey & Eli. Ariel and Zoey are identical twins born in 1998. Elijah was born in 2001. As of January, 2018 the three had a Facebook fanbase approaching 3,000,000 where their videos had been viewed over 100,000,000 times. In 2015 the three received a Daytime Emmy Nomination in the category Outstanding Original Song, becoming the youngest ever to receive a nomination in that category.

The three have two television shows. The first, Ariel & Zoey & Eli, Too, is a nationally syndicated children's musical variety program. The show entered syndication in September 2010.  Guests appearing on the show include Kevin Costner, Miranda Cosgrove and David Archuleta.

In the summer of 2012, Ariel, Zoey and Eli were introduced to Jim Peterik.  Peterik, the Grammy Award winning songwriter (Eye of the Tiger, Vehicle, The Search is Over), had composed an anti bully song called "Hey Bully!" and asked the three to record it.  Over the following three months, the four recorded "Hey Bully!" and during that time a new television show, "Steal the Show" (reality show following the four recording new songs) would enter production.

Networks/stations airing Ariel & Zoey & Eli, Too and Steal the Show include NBC owned and operated stations via Cozi TV, WTVS Detroit, WGTE-TV Toledo and ZUUS Country.

References

2010s American children's television series
2010 American television series debuts